Venezuelan crisis or Venezuela crisis may refer to:
Venezuelan crisis of 1895, between Venezuela and the United Kingdom
Venezuelan crisis of 1902–03, between Venezuela and Britain, Germany and Italy 
Dutch–Venezuelan crisis of 1908, between Venezuela and the Netherlands
Venezuelan banking crisis of 1994
Venezuelan refugee crisis
2005 Mexico–Venezuela diplomatic crisis
Venezuelan banking crisis of 2009–10
2010 Colombia–Venezuela diplomatic crisis
Crisis in Venezuela during the Bolivarian Revolution (2010–present)
Shortages in Venezuela, 2010-
2013–present economic crisis in Venezuela
2015 Venezuela–Colombia migrant crisis
Energy crisis in Venezuela
2019 Venezuelan presidential crisis